Bourdelles is a commune in the Gironde department in Nouvelle-Aquitaine in southwestern France. It lies on the right bank of the Garonne, upstream from La Réole.

Population

See also
Communes of the Gironde department

References

Communes of Gironde